Seltsa is a rural locality (a village) in Tonshalovskoye Rural Settlement, Cherepovetsky District, Vologda Oblast, Russia. The population was 53 as of 2002. There are 2 streets.

Geography 
Seltsa is located 12 km northwest of Cherepovets (the district's administrative centre) by road. Bolshoy Dvor is the nearest rural locality.

References 

Rural localities in Cherepovetsky District